Two Songs is a pair of songs for voice and piano composed in 191718 by John Ireland (18791962). Both are settings of poems by Rupert Brooke (18871915) from his collection 1914.

A performance of both songs takes around 6 minutes. The songs are:

 "The Soldier" 
 "Blow Out, You Bugles"

References 

Song cycles by John Ireland
1918 compositions
Musical settings of poems by Rupert Brooke
Songs based on poems